Fountain Point Resort is a historic landmark located on the eastern shore of South Lake Leelanau in Suttons Bay Township, Michigan. Its name is derived from a fountain of sparkling artesian spring water, situated on a large point on Lake Leelanau, which has been continuously gushing since 1867.

History
Circa 1860, a French fur trader, Aymar de Belloy, was plying his trade near the narrows of Carp Lake and became convinced of the beauty and bounty of the area and purchased a parcel of land.

Following de Belloy's disappointment over his failure to strike oil, the land changed hands several times until 1887, when it was purchased by Lydia Morrison of Cincinnati, Ohio. In June 1889, she established "The Fountain Point House," a Victorian-style mansion, and guests began arriving for the summer by steamboat and buggy. The main three-story building was the center of activity, and it included a large dining room, kitchen and lounge.

By 1903, the Traverse City, Leelanau, and Manistique Railroad began operating between Traverse City and Northport, stopping at Fountain Point, improving transportation of people and products.

Over the years, several cottages were built, and Fountain Point Resort has become a popular destination featuring rich history and simple family pleasures.

In 1975, Fountain Point Resort was listed on the State of Michigan historic registry, and in 2003 it was placed on the National Register of Historic Places.

Today
Fountain Point Resort is one of the oldest recreational hotel complexes of its type in the state, and encompasses  of land, including a half-mile (0.8 km) of lakefront and the fountain.  It is presently owned by Susan Jay Nichols; the property has been in her family for three generations.  Her oldest son, Erik Zehender, manages the property.

Located near the quiet community of Lake Leelanau, the resort has a "no TV" policy, and features swimming, boating, tennis and numerous other indoor and outdoor activities.  In addition, Fountain Point hosts numerous community and special events.

Concerts
Throughout the summer and Fall, the resort hosts musical performances featuring diverse groups and artists such as The Traverse Symphony Orchestra, The Accidentals, The Crane Wives, The Ragbirds and many others.

Lectures
From time to time the resort hosts lectures on various topics, such as gardening.

Rowing
The resort partners with the University of Michigan to offer rowing camps, and is home to the Lake Leelanau Rowing Club.

See also
 Fountain Point
 
 
 List of Michigan State Historic Sites in Leelanau County, Michigan

References

External links

 Fountain Point Resort website
 Suttons Bay Township website
 Leelanau Historical Museum and Society
 Maps
 State of Michigan website re historical significance
 National Register of Historic Places

Houses on the National Register of Historic Places in Michigan
1889 establishments in Michigan
Resorts in Michigan
Tourist attractions in Leelanau County, Michigan
Houses in Leelanau County, Michigan
National Register of Historic Places in Leelanau County, Michigan